The Potez 29 was a 1920s French passenger biplane designed and built by Avions Henry Potez. Although designed as a civilian aircraft, a large number entered service with the French Air Force.

Development
The Potez 29 was a biplane powered by a nose-mounted 335 kW (450 hp) Lorraine 12Eb broad-arrow piston engine, with a fixed tailskid landing gear. Based on the earlier Potez 25, with the same wings and engine, the Potez 29 had a new fuselage with an enclosed cockpit for two crew and a cabin for five passengers. The 29 proved to be a success; it entered service with civilian airlines, and 120 were delivered to the French Air Force, mainly as an air ambulance and light transport.

Variants
Potez 29
Prototype and six production aircraft with a Lorraine 12Eb engine.
Potez 29/2
Production variant for the French Air Force with a Lorraine 12Eb engine, 123 built.
Potez 29/4
Civil variant with a 359 kW (480 hp) Gnome-Rhône 9Ady Jupiter radial engine, 15 built.

Operators

Civil operators
 CIDNA
 LARES
 Aeroput

Military operators
 French Air Force
 Free French Air Force
 Royal Air Force

Specifications (Potez 29)

See also

References

 
 

1920s French civil utility aircraft
029
Biplanes
Single-engined tractor aircraft
Aircraft first flown in 1927
Sesquiplanes